Balgowan is a rural locality in the Toowoomba Region, Queensland, Australia. In the  Balgowan had a population of 14 people.

Geography 
Like much of the Darling Downs, Balgowan is flat agricultural land. It is about 440 metres about sea level and is used for both cropping and grazing, all freehold.

The Oakey–Cooyar Road, locally named Pechey - Maclagan Road, passes through the locality from south-east to north.

History 
Plainview State School (sometimes appears as Plain View State School) opened on 1 December 1884 and closed in December 1921.

In the  Balgowan had a population of 14 people.

References 

Toowoomba Region
Localities in Queensland